Der Komödienstadel is a German comedy franchise, which consists of a television series, radio plays and stage shows. It was first developed by Olf Fischer as a radio play series which first aired on Bayerischer Rundfunk on 19 April 1954. The television series was launched in 1959. The radio plays featured actors such as Gustl Bayrhammer, Max Grießer, Maxl Graf, Erni Singerl and Ludwig Schmid-Wildy.

Series

 1959 – Der zerbrochene Krug with Hans Baur and Ludwig Schmid-Wildy
 1959 – Späte Entdeckung with Michl Lang and Liesl Karlstadt
 1959 – Kraft mal Weg with Carl Baierl and Hannes Keppler
 1959 – Das Taufessen with Liesl Karlstadt, Erni Singerl and Ludwig Schmid-Wildy
 1959 – Ja so ein Auerhahn with Ludwig Schmid-Wildy
 1961 – Der Zigeunersimmerl with Michl Lang and Ruth Kappelsberger
 1961 – Die drei Eisbären with Maxl Graf, Michl Lang and Franz Fröhlich
 1961 – Lottchens Geburtstag with Franziska Stömmer and Rolf Castell
 1962 – Graf Schorschi with Michl Lang, Lucie Englisch and Maxl Graf
 1962 – Das Dienstjubiläum with Michl Lang, Martha Kunig-Rinach, Maxl Graf and Erni Singerl
 1962 – Der Hochzeiter with Ludwig Schmid-Wildy, Ruth Kappelsberger and Helmut Fischer
 1963 – Der Geisterbräu with Ruth Kappelsberger
 1963 – Der Schusternazi with Franz Fröhlich (Schusternazi), Ludwig Schmid-Wildy and Maxl Graf
 1964 – Die Entwicklungshilfe with Lucie Englisch and Maxl Graf
 1964 – Die Tochter des Bombardon with Michl Lang, Marianne Lindner, Maxl Graf and Max Grießer
 1964 – Wenn der Hahn kräht with Michl Lang and Marianne Lindner
 1965 – Die Stadterhebung with Fritz Strassner, Maxl Graf, Ludwig Schmid-Wildy and Erni Singerl
 1966 – Die Mieterhöhung with Michl Lang and Maxl Graf
 1967 – Krach um Jolanthe with Michl Lang and Maxl Graf
 1967 – Der verkaufte Großvater with Michl Lang, Karl Tischlinger, Marianne Lindner and Erni Singerl
 1969 – Das Wander des heiligen Florian with Michl Lang and Erni Singerl
 1969 – Witwen with Fritz Straßner, Ruth Kappelsberger, Erni Singerl, Max Grießer and Gustl Bayrhammer
 1970 – Alles für die Katz with Marianne Lindner, Ursula Herion and Erni Singerl
 1970 – Der Ehrengast with Gustl Bayrhammer, Beppo Brem, Gerd Fitz and Ludwig Schmid-Wildy
 1971 – Der Ehestreik with Maxl Graf and Michl Lang
 1972 – Josef Filser with Beppo Brem and Fritz Straßner
 1972 – Mattheis bricht's Eis with Ludwig Schmid-Wildy and Rosl Mayr
 1973 – Die drei Dorfheiligen with Gustl Bayrhammer and Marianne Lindner
 1973 – Die drei Eisbären with Gustl Bayrhammer, Gaby Dohm, Maxl Graf and Gerhart Lippert
 1973 – Kleine Welt with Gustl Bayrhammer, Katharina de Bruyn and Simone Rethel
 1974 – Das sündige Dorf with Gustl Bayrhammer and Marianne Lindner
 1975 – Der Bauerndiplomat with Karl Tischlinger and Max Grießer
 1975 – Thomas auf der Himmelsleiter with Gerhart Lippert and Max Grießer
 1976 – Herz am Spieß with Katharina de Bruyn and Karl Tischlinger
 1976 – Der bayerische Picasso with Karl Tischlinger and Marianne Lindner
 1976 – Der verkaufte Großvater with Ludwig Schmid-Wildy and Walter Sedlmayr
 1976 – Die Generalprobe with Karl Tischlinger and Marianne Lindner
 1977 – Graf Schorschi with Beppo Brem and Marianne Lindner
 1977 – St. Pauli in St. Peter with Bernd Helfrich and Maxl Graf
 1977 – Die Widerspenstigen with Gerhart Lippert and Katharina de Bruyn
 1978 – Der ledige Hof with Katharina de Bruyn and Gerhart Lippert and Max Grießer
 1979 – Der Geisterbräu with Gerhart Lippert and Katharina de Bruyn
 1980 – Der Strohwitwer with Peter Steiner and Max Grießer
 1981 – Spätlese – Auch der Herbst hat schöne Tage with Gustl Bayrhammer and Katharina de Bruyn
 1982 – Die Tochter des Bombardon with Gustl Bayrhammer and Ruth Kappelsberger
 1983 – Heiratsfieber with Gerhart Lippert, Maxl Graf, Katharina de Bruyn, Manuela Denz and Max Grießer
 1984 – Der Senior with Maxl Graf and Kathi Leitner
 1984 – Liebe und Blechschaden with Max Grießer and Katharina de Bruyn
 1984 – Doppelte Moral with Max Grießer, Katharina de Bruyn, Bernd Helfrich and Christine Neubauer
 1985 – Politik und Führerschein with Gerhart Lippert and Max Grießer
 1985 – Paraplü und Perpendikel with Gerhart Lippert, Maria Singer, Max Grießer, Manuela Denz, Claus Obalski and Georg Einerdinger
 1985 – Wenn der Hahn kräht with Maxl Graf, Katharina de Bruyn, Julya Fischer, Beppo Brem and Ruth Kappelsberger
 1985 – Der Onkel Pepi with Katharina de Bruyn and Gerd Fitz
 1985 – Der Schneesturm with Gerhart Lippert, Erni Singerl, Mona Freiberg, Toni Berger, Werner Zeussel and Manuela Denz
 1986 – Der Nothelfer with Max Grießer and Katharina de Bruyn
 1986 – Glück mit Monika with Bernd Helfrich
 1986 – Das Prämienkind with Gerd Fitz and Max Grießer
 1987 – Doppelselbstmord with Max Grießer and Katharina de Bruyn
 1989 – Der brave Sünder with Max Grießer and Katharina de Bruyn
 1990 – Die hölzerne Jungfrau with Max Grießer and Marianne Lindner
 1991 – Millionen im Heu with Gerhart Lippert and Mona Freiberg
 1993 – Der siebte Bua with Bernd Helfrich, Sabina Trooger, and Fred Stillkrauth
 1993 – Die Kartenlegerin with Udo Thomer and Veronika Fitz
 1994 – Die goldene Gans with Toni Berger and Hansi Kraus
 1994 – Die Hochzeitskutsche with Fred Stillkrauth and Max Grießer
 1995 – Der müde Theodor with Willy Harlander and Mona Freiberg
 1995 – Der Wadlbeißer von Traxlbach with Bernd Helfrich
 1996 – Minister gesucht with Gerd Fitz, Ilse Neubauer and Toni Berger
 1996 – Zur Ehe haben sich versprochen with Heide Ackermann, Christiane Blumhoff, Ernst Cohen, Toni Berger and Eleonore Daniel
 1997 – Bonifaz, der Orgelstifter with Toni Berger and Kathi Leitner, Alexander Duda, Joseph Hannesschläger
 1998 – Der verkaufte Großvater with Toni Berger and Willy Harlander
 1999 – Der Zigeunersimmerl with Hans Clarin, Max Grießer and Maria Singer
 1999 – Lachende Wahrheit with Erni Singerl and Josef ThalMayer
 1999 – Der Leberkasbaron with Fred Stillkrauth, Toni Berger and Kathi Leitner
 2000 – Das liebe Geld with Toni Berger, Kathi Leitner and Willy Harlander
 2000 – Die Bißgurrn with Christiane Blumhoff and Hans Kitzbichler
 2000 – s' Herz am rechten Fleck with Werner Rom, Anton Feichtner and Josef ThalMayer
 2001 – Heldenstammtisch with Anton Feichtner and Jutta SchmutterMayer
 2001 – Die Jacobi-Verschwörung with Toni Berger and Winfried Frey
 2002 – Achterbahn ins Glück with Gerhart Lippert, Jutta SchmutterMayer and Anton Feichtner
 2003 – Das Attenhamer Christkindl with Heide Ackermann and Christiane Blumhoff
 2004 – Der Prinzregentenhirsch with Heide Ackermann and Götz Burger
 2004 – s' Breznbusserl with Franz Xaver Huber and Christiane Blumhoff
 2004 – Skandal im Doktorhaus with Hermann Giefer, Heide Ackermann and Veronika von Quast
 2005 – Amerikaner mit Zuckerguss with Winfried Frey and Franz Xaver Huber and Christiane Blumhoff
 2005 – Der weibscheue Hof with Erni Singerl and Götz Burger
 2005 – Karten lügen nicht with Werner Zeussel and Christiane Blumhoff
 2005 – Hopfazupfa with Monika Baumgartner and Harald Dietl
 2005 – Der Habererbräu with Jutta SchmutterMayer and Hans Kitzbichler
 2005 – Herzsolo with Hans Schuler and Veronika von Quast
 2005 – Kuckuckskind with Fred Stillkrauth, Alexander Duda and Christiane Blumhoff
 2006 – Die Maybaumwache with Sepp Schauer and Winfried Frey
 2006 – Der Prämienstier with Erich Hallhuber sen. and Monika Baumgartner
 2007 – Alles fest im Griff with Heide Ackermann, Brigitte Walbrun, Hans Schuler and Franz Xaver Huber
 2007 – Dottore d'Amore with Anton Feichtner, Franz Xaver Huber, Dieter Fischer, Christiane Blumhoff, Sara Sommerfeldt and Eleonore Daniel
 2007 – Der Fischerkrieg vom Chiemsee with Horst Kummeth, Natalie Spinell, Marianne Lindner, Jutta SchmutterMayer and Hans Schuler
 2007 – Links Rechts Gradaus with Horst Kummeth, Jutta SchmutterMayer and Christiane Blumhoff
 2007 – Das Cäcilienwander with Heide Ackermann, Christiane Blumhoff and Winfried Frey
 2007 – Der magische Anton with Christian K. Schaeffer, Hans Schuler and Bettina Redlich
 2007 – Die Versuchung des Aloysius Federl with Hans Schuler, Götz Burger and Christiane Blumhoff
 2008 – Foulspui with Alexander Duda, Bettina Redlich and Eva-Maria Reichert
 2008 – Weiberwallfahrt with Monika Baumgartner and Erich Hallhuber senior
 2008 – Adam und Eva im Paradies with Markus NeuMayer, Heide Ackermann and Corinna Binzer
 2008 – G'suacht and g'fandn with Monika Baumgartner, Alexander Duda, Sabrina White and Christian K. Schaeffer,
 2008 – Pension Schaller with Hans Schuler, Heide Ackermann and Christiane Blumhoff
 2008 – Die schöne Münchnerin with Isabella Jantz, Winfried Frey
 2008 – Der letzte Bär von Bayern with Pavel Fieber, Enzi Fuchs
 2009 – Glenn Miller & Sauschwanzl with Corinna Binzer, Johannes Herrschmann and Hans Schuler
 2009 – Endstation Drachenloch with Hans Schuler, Heide Ackermann and Markus NeuMayer
 2009 – Verhexte Hex with Sebastian Edtbauer, Heide Ackermann, Isabella Jantz and Veronika von Quast
 2009 – Die Doktorfalle with Hans Schuler, Christian K. Schaeffer, Stefan Murr
 2010 – Die Provinzdiva with Sabrina White, Christiane Blumhoff, Gerhart Lippert
 2010 – Duttenfeiler with Hans Schuler, Heide Ackermann, Dieter Fischer
 2010 – Das Kreuz mit den Schwestern with Markus NeuMayer, Heide Ackermann, Ina Meling
 2011 – Herz ist Gold with Christiane Blumhoff, Heide Ackermann, Winfried Frey
 2011 – A Flascherl vom Glück with Dieter Fischer, Corinna Binzer, Matthias Ransberger
 2012 – Lauter Hornochsen with Hans Schuler, Matthias Ransberger, Lilian Naumann
 2012 – Die fromme Helene with Heide Ackermann, Dieter Fischer
 2012 – Obandlt is! with Heide Ackermann, Winfried Frey, Corinna Binzer, Ina Meling
 2012 – Hummel im Himmel with Matthias Ransberger, Saskia Vester, Heinz-Josef Braun, Katharina Schwägerl
 2013 – Allein unter Kühen with Dieter Fischer, Heide Ackermann, Winfried Hübner, Young-Shin Kim
 2013 – A Mordsgschicht with Senta Auth, Christian K. Schaeffer, Heide Ackermann, Susanne Brückner, Matthias Ransberger, Norbert Heckner, Gerd Lohmeyer, Veronika von Quast
 2013 – Alpenglühn und Männertreu with Winfried Frey, Johanna Bittenbinder, Gerhard Wittmann, Hans Schuler, Teresa Rizos, Corinna Binzer, Kathrin Anna Stahl
 2014 – 1001 Nacht in Tegernbrunn with Ferdinand Schmidt-Modrow, Harald Helfrich, Conny Glogger, Susanne Brückner, Alexander Duda, Matthias Ransberger, Bernhard Ulrich, Ina Meling, Jürgen Fischer
 2014 – Wenn's lafft, dann lafft's with Dieter Fischer, Katharina Schwägerl, Julya Urban, Heide Ackermann, Johannes Herrschmann, Stefan Murr
 2014 – Paulas letzter Wille with Heide Ackermann, Matthias Ransberger, Götz Burger, Corinna Binzer, Claus Steigenberger, Judith Mauthe, Stephen Sikder, Caro Hetényi, Leo Reisinger, Sarah Camp
 2015 – Der fast keusche Josef with Dieter Fischer, Johanna Bittenbinder, Moritz KatzMayr, Ina Meling, Corinna Binzer, Christian K. Schaeffer, Andreas Bittl
 2015 – Agent Alois with Heinz-Josef Braun, Benedikt Blaskovic, Ramona Kunze-Libnow, Johanna Martin, Hans Schuler, Bettina Redlich, Matthias Ransberger and Markus Baumeister
 2015 – Ein Garten voll Schlawiner with Heide Ackermann, Ferdinand Schmidt-Modrow, Veronika Hörmann, Corinna Binzer, Georg Luibl, Norbert Heckner and Matthias Ransberger
 2016 – Göttinnen weißblau with Johanna Bittenbinder, Dieter Fischer, Winfried Hübner, Heide Ackermann, Corinna Binzer, Andreas Bittl and Markus NeuMayer
 2016 – Der Cowboy von Haxlfing with Markus Baumeister, Winfried Hübner, Teresa Rizos, Hans Schuler, Armin Stockerer, Franz-Xaver Zeller, Nikola Norgauer, Wolfgang Mirlach and Bernd Kleinschnitz
 2017 – Rock 'n' Roll im Abendrot with Heide Ackermann, Maria Peschek, Werner Haindl, Winfried "Waggi" Hübner, Bettina Redlich, Annabel Faber, Andreas Bittle, Horst Rankl and Gerhard Berger

See also
List of German television series

References

German comedy television series
Television shows set in Bavaria
1950s German television series
1960s German television series
1970s German television series
1980s German television series
1990s German television series
2000s German television series
2010s German television series
1959 German television series debuts
German-language television shows
Das Erste original programming